Brian Adam Dinkelman (born November 10, 1983) is an American retired professional baseball second baseman who is the manager of the Cedar Rapids Kernels, the Class-A minor-league affiliate of the Minnesota Twins. Dinkelman was drafted by the Minnesota Twins in the eighth round of the 2006 MLB draft, and made his MLB debut on June 4, 2011. He last played professional baseball in 2013, transitioning into coaching in the Twins organization.  He served as the Kernels' hitting coach prior to his promotion to manager for the 2019 season.

Early life
Brian Adam Dinkelman was born on November 10, 1983, in Centralia, Illinois. He attended Centralia High School, where he played basketball and golf along with baseball. After graduation, Dinkelman played baseball at McKendree College in Lebanon, Illinois, for the McKendree Bearcats. Dinkelman won the American Midwest Conference Player of the Year award from 2004 to 2006, and won the National Association of Intercollegiate Athletics (NAIA) Player of the Year award his senior year. At McKendree, Dinkelman set 25 career school records, as well as five NAIA career records.

After college, Dinkelman was drafted by the Minnesota Twins in the eighth round of the 2006 MLB draft; he signed with the team on June 8, 2006.

Playing career
In his first professional season, Dinkelman played for the Elizabethton Twins of the Rookie Appalachian League. Over 46 games played, Dinkelman batted .298 with four home runs and 32 runs batted in. Defensively, Dinkelman predominately played as a second baseman. In 2007, he was selected to play in the Western Division of the Midwest League All-Star game, representing the Beloit Snappers. In June of the same year, he was promoted to the Advanced A class Fort Myers Miracle; combined, Dinkelman batted .269 in 131 games played, and was voted the "Mightiest Miracle Player" (the favorite Fort Myers Miracle player) by fans.

In 2008, Dinkelman continued his professional career, playing for the Miracle as well as the New Britain Rock Cats. Along with teammates Rob Delaney, Jeff Manship, Anthony Slama and Danny Valencia, Dinkelman represented the Fort Myers Miracle in the Florida State League All-Star game. He finished the season with the AA Rock Cats, batting a combined .272 with four home runs, 40 RBI, and 12 stolen bases.

From May 1–7, 2009, Dinkelman was the Twins' Minor League Player of the Week. He was named to his third consecutive All-Star team after batting .299 with four home runs and 43 RBI in the first half of the season. For the year, Dinkelman posted club highs in hits, doubles and walks to help the Rock Cats make their first post-season appearance since 2003. After the season, Dinkelman was named to the Eastern League All-Star Post-Season team as a utility player.

Dinkelman spent the entire 2010 season with the Rochester Red Wings. He led his team in games played (137), total bases (199), and hits (139), while playing right field, left field and second base. He began the 2011 year with the Red Wings before being promoted to the Minnesota Twins on June 2, 2011, to replace shortstop Trevor Plouffe. On June 4, 2011, Dinkelman made his MLB debut, where he was hit by a pitch and intentionally walked, while also recording a single.Dinkelman reflects on Major League debut
KANSAS CITY—Brian Dinkelman will have some special memories of his Major League debut on Saturday night.

After starting in left field for the Twins, Dinkelman had a diving catch and picked up his first hit with a line drive single to left. A large group of fans cheered on Dinkelman, chanting "MVP" and "Dink-el-man" when he came to the plate.

"It's awesome," Dinkelman said. "Getting to the Major Leagues was always something I wanted to do. When you get here and then get that first hit, it's a great feeling."

Dinkelman, a left-handed hitter, wasn't in the lineup on Sunday with left-hander Jeff Francis on the mound. That left him with some time to reflect on the debut after earning a promotion from Triple-A Rochester.

"It's really good to get that first hit because you don't want to go too long and put the pressure on yourself," Dinkelman said. "You get one out of the way and then see how things go from there."

Dinkelman had some friends and family from Illinois in attendance, but the loud chants for him were coming from a larger section of the crowd.

"I have no idea who those people were," Dinkelman said with a smile.

He was outrighted to the Red Wings on June 16, and recalled to the Twins on September 5, 2011. For the Twins in 2011, Dinkelman batted .301, with four RBI and no home runs. However, he also had a .373 BABIP, contributing to his high average. On October 22, after being outrighted off the roster, he declared free agency. Later in the 2011 while with Rochester, Brian made a grab that was featured as number 1 on ESPN's SportsCenter top 10 plays.

On November 10, 2011, Dinkelman signed a minor league contract to return to the Minnesota Twins. He played all of 2012 with Rochester, but he missed 2 months of the season from a hand injury. In 74 games, he hit .252 with 4 HR and 32 RBI.

On October 29, 2012, Dinkelman re-signed with the Twins. Dinkelman once again played the season in Rochester, and was used mostly off the bench. In 84 games in 2013, he hit .215 with 6 HR and 23 RBI. Over 4 seasons and 427 games with Rochester in his career, he hit .248 with 21 HR and 150 RBI.

References

External links

1983 births
Living people
Baseball coaches from Illinois
Baseball players from Illinois
Beloit Snappers players
Elizabethton Twins players
Fort Myers Miracle players
Major League Baseball left fielders
Major League Baseball right fielders
Major League Baseball second basemen
McKendree Bearcats baseball players
Minnesota Twins players
Minor league baseball coaches
Minor league baseball managers
New Britain Rock Cats players
People from Centralia, Illinois
Rochester Red Wings players